Two ships of the United States Navy have been named USS Reno, the first after Walter E. Reno, and the second after the city of Reno, Nevada.

 The first  was a destroyer in service from 1920 to 1930.
 The second  was a light cruiser in service from 1943 to 1946.

See also
 Reno (disambiguation)

United States Navy ship names